Hapalopus is a genus of tarantulas that was first described by Anton Ausserer in 1875.

Diagnosis 
They own a ring like keel on the palpal bulb, the tibial apophysis with convergent branches and a spermatheca having a membrane like base. They also lack stridulatory hairs and they own numerous labial cuspules.

Species 
 it contains nine species, found in South America and Panama:
Hapalopus aymara Perdomo, Panzera & Pérez-Miles, 2009 – Bolivia, Brazil
Hapalopus butantan (Pérez-Miles, 1998) – Brazil
Hapalopus coloratus (Valerio, 1982) – Panama
Hapalopus formosus Ausserer, 1875 (type) – Colombia
Hapalopus gasci (Maréchal, 1996) – French Guiana
Hapalopus lesleyae Gabriel, 2011 – Guyana
Hapalopus nigriventris (Mello-Leitão, 1939) – Venezuela
Hapalopus serrapelada Fonseca-Ferreira, Zampaulo & Guadanucci, 2017 – Brazil
Hapalopus triseriatus Caporiacco, 1955 – Venezuela
Hapalopus variegatus (Caporiacco, 1955) – Venezuela

In synonymy 
H. magdalena (Karsch, 1879) = Hapalopus formosus Ausserer, 1875

Nomen dubium 

 Hapalopus limensis Vellard, 1954 – (Though the description by Vellard wasn't published)

Transferred to other genera 

 Hapalopus aldana (West, 2000) → Magnacarina aldana
 Hapalopus flavohirtus Simon, 1889 → Catanduba flavohirta
 Hapalopus guianensis Caporiacco, 1954 → Neostenotarsus guianensis
 Hapalopus incei F. O. Pickard-Cambridge, 1898 → Neoholothele incei
 Hapalopus nondescriptus Mello-Leitão, 1926 → Vitalius nondescriptus
 Hapalopus pentaloris (Simon, 1888) → Davus pentaloris
 Hapalopus pictus Pocock, 1903 → Anqasha picta
 Hapalopus rectimanus Mello-Leitão, 1923 → Plesiopelma rectimanum
 Hapalopus semiaurantiacus (Simon, 1897) → Plesiopelma semiaurantiacum
 Hapalopus tripepii (Dresco, 1984) → Nhandu tripepii
 Hapalopus versicolor (Simon, 1897) → Cyriocosmus versicolor

See also 
 List of Theraphosidae species

References 

Theraphosidae genera
Spiders of South America
Taxa named by Anton Ausserer
Theraphosidae
Hapalopus